Jeremiah 48 is the forty-eighth chapter of the Book of Jeremiah in the Hebrew Bible or the Old Testament of the Christian Bible. This book contains prophecies attributed to the prophet Jeremiah, and is one of the Books of the Prophets. This chapter is part of a series of "oracles against foreign nations", consisting of chapters 46 to 51. In particular, chapters 46-49 focus on Judah's neighbors. This chapter contains the poetic oracles against Moab.

Text
The original text was written in Hebrew. This chapter is divided into 47 verses.

Textual witnesses
Some early manuscripts containing the text of this chapter in Hebrew are of the Masoretic Text tradition, which includes the Codex Cairensis (895), the Petersburg Codex of the Prophets (916), Aleppo Codex (10th century), Codex Leningradensis (1008). Some fragments containing parts of this chapter were found among the Dead Sea Scrolls, i.e., 2QJer (2Q13; 1st century CE), with extant verses 2‑4, 7, 25‑39, 41‑45.

There is also a translation into Koine Greek known as the Septuagint (with a different chapter and verse numbering), made in the last few centuries BCE. Extant ancient manuscripts of the Septuagint version include Codex Vaticanus (B; B; 4th century), Codex Sinaiticus (S; BHK: S; 4th century), Codex Alexandrinus (A; A; 5th century) and Codex Marchalianus (Q; Q; 6th century).  The Septuagint version doesn't contain a part which are generally known to be verses 45–46 in Christian Bibles.

Parashot
The parashah sections listed here are based on the Aleppo Codex. Jeremiah 48 is a part of the prophecies in Jeremiah 46-49 in the section of Prophecies against the nations (Jeremiah 46-51). {P}: open parashah; {S}: closed parashah.
 {P} 48:1-11 {S} 48:12-39 {S} 48:40-47 {S}

Verse numbering
The order of chapters and verses of the Book of Jeremiah in the English Bibles, Masoretic Text (Hebrew), and Vulgate (Latin), in some places differs from that in the Septuagint (LXX, the Greek Bible used in the Eastern Orthodox Church and others) according to Rahlfs or Brenton. The following table is taken with minor adjustments from Brenton's Septuagint, page 971.

The order of Computer Assisted Tools for Septuagint/Scriptural Study (CATSS) based on Alfred Rahlfs' Septuaginta (1935) differs in some details from Joseph Ziegler's critical edition (1957) in Göttingen LXX. Swete's Introduction mostly agrees with Rahlfs' edition (=CATSS).

Structure
This chapter seems to be a sequence of three parts: verses 1–13; 14–38, and 39–45.

Verse 1
Against Moab.
Thus says the Lord of hosts, the God of Israel:
 "Woe to Nebo!
 For it is plundered,
 Kirjathaim [is shamed] and taken;
 The high stronghold is shamed and dismayed—
The Septuagint omits the words 'is shamed'.

Verse 7
For because you have trusted in your works and in your treasures,
you will also be captured;
and Chemosh shall go forth into captivity
together with his priests and his officials.
"Chemosh": was the national god of the Moabites. The downfall of Chemosh is repeated in verses 13 and 46.

Verse 34
For the waters of Nimrim also shall be desolate.

See also

Related Bible part: Isaiah 15, Isaiah 16, Isaiah 24

References

Bibliography

External links

Jewish
Jeremiah 48 Hebrew with Parallel English

Christian
Jeremiah 48, English Translation with Parallel Latin Vulgate

48